Anthanassa ardys, the Ardys crescent, is a butterfly of the family Nymphalidae. It is found from southern Mexico, through Central America to Colombia. In elevational abundance patterns based in Oaxaca, Mexico, Anthanassa ardys are typically present at mid elevation levels, with records showing they lack in areas of lower and higher elevations.

Subspecies
Anthanassa ardys ardys (southern Mexico, Nicaragua, Costa Rica, Colombia)
Anthanassa ardys subota (Guatemala: Polochic Valley, Costa Rica)

References
 Luis-Martínez, Armando, Omar Ávalos-Hernández, Marysol Trujano-Ortega, Arturo Arellano-Covarrubias, Isabel Vargas-Fernández, and Jorge Llorente-Bousquets. (2022). "Distribution, diversity, endemism, and ecology of Nymphalid butterflies (Lepidoptera: Nymphalidae) in the Loxicha Region, Oaxaca, Mexico." Revista de Biología Tropical, 70: 363-407. https://doi.org/10.15517/rev.biol.trop..v70i1.48821

Melitaeini
Nymphalidae of South America
Butterflies described in 1864
Taxa named by William Chapman Hewitson
Butterflies of North America